Allsbrook is an unincorporated community in Horry County, in the U.S. state of South Carolina.

History
An early variant name was "Sanford". A rail stop was located in the settlement. A post office called Allsbrook was established in 1915, and remained in operation until 1947. The present name is after N. B. Allsbrook and J. R. Allsbrook, brothers and first settlers.

References

Unincorporated communities in South Carolina
Unincorporated communities in Horry County, South Carolina